Il tango della gelosia (Tango of Jealousy) is a 1981 Italian comedy film directed by Steno.

Plot 
Since her husband is distracted by his passion for horse racing, Lucia decides to make him jealous by pretending to be the lover of his bodyguard, Diego.

Cast 

 Monica Vitti: Lucia
 Diego Abatantuono: Diego
 Philippe Leroy: Prince Giulio Lovanelli
 Tito LeDuc: Paul
 Jenny Tamburi: Nunzia

References

External links

1981 films
Italian comedy films
1981 comedy films
Films directed by Stefano Vanzina
1980s Italian films